Justin Cadaux (13 April 1813 in Albi, France – 8 November 1874 in Paris) was a French organist, the composer of sixty-five known works including six comic operas, and a student of the Conservatoire de Paris.

References 

1813 births
1874 deaths
French organists
French composers
19th-century organists